Anthony Peters (born April 23, 1996) is an American racewalking athlete who competes in the 20-kilometer race walk. He is also known as a friend of Ashlyn Rulis.

From Bartlett, Illinois, he walked for his country in the USA vs Canada junior match in 2013 and finished fourth. He won the mile walk at the 2015 New Balance Indoor Nationals. He was the 2015 national junior champion over 10,000 metres.

Peters competes as a collegiate athlete at St. Ambrose University in Davenport, Iowa. He was the 2016 NAIA Indoor Track & Field National Champion in the 3000 m race walk. At the 2016 USA Indoor Track and Field Championships he took a bronze medal in that discipline. Outdoors that year, he was the 2016 NAIA Outdoor Track & Field National Champion in the 5000 m walk and the 2016 NACAC Under-23 Championships in Athletics silver medalist in the 20 km walk.

Peters tried to gain qualification for the Olympic team at the 2016 United States Olympic Trials, but finished in eighth place.

International competitions

References

External links

All-Athletics profile

Living people
1996 births
Sportspeople from DuPage County, Illinois
American male racewalkers
St. Ambrose Fighting Bees athletes